Kurkovskaya is a rural locality (a village) in Tarnogskoye Rural Settlement, Tarnogsky District, Vologda Oblast, Russia. The population was 35 as of 2002.

Geography 
Kurkovskaya is located 14 km northwest of Tarnogsky Gorodok (the district's administrative centre) by road. Podgornaya is the nearest rural locality.

References 

Rural localities in Tarnogsky District